Ariston Records was a record company established in Milan, Italy, by Alfredo Rossi (1925–2008).  It was active from 1964 to 1989.  It was part of the larger Ariston Group, which was founded in 1949 by Alfredo and his brother, the composer Carlo Alberto Rossi (it) (1921–2010), and which included several publishing firms, recording studios, and a record pressing plant.

Recording artists with the label and subsidiaries 
Musicians who recorded for the label included I Corvi, Bruno Lauzi, Ornella Vanoni, Mino Reitano, Franco Califano, Tony Renis, Claudio Rocchi, and Donatella Rettore.

Ariston labels 
 Victory (it)
 First (it)
 Jet (it)
 Victory (it)

Ariston's music publishing imprints 
 Edizioni musicali Ariston (it)
 Santa Cecilia (namesake of Accademia Nazionale di Santa Cecilia, a music conservatory)
 Pettirosso
 M.E.C. [Music European Co.]
 Accademia
 First
 Formidable
 Regent
 Palace

References

Notes

References 

 

 

 . .

Italian record labels
Music in Milan
Record labels established in 1964
Record labels disestablished in 1989